Velké Březno is a municipality and village in Ústí nad Labem District in the Ústí nad Labem Region of the Czech Republic. It has about 2,300 inhabitants.

Administrative parts
The village of Valtířov is an administrative part of Velké Březno.

Economy
Velké Březno is known for its brewery, which produces beer under the brand Březňák.

References

Villages in Ústí nad Labem District